The documentary In the Mirror of Maya Deren (Im Spiegel der Maya Deren, 2001) is a film about avant garde filmmaker Maya Deren (1917-1961) by Austrian film maker Martina Kudláček. It is based on the biography The Legend of Maya Deren.
The soundtrack to this documentary was made by the avant-garde composer John Zorn.

External links
 
 Links to reviews of this film

Works about avant-garde and experimental art
Documentary films about film directors and producers
2001 documentary films
Films scored by John Zorn
Austrian documentary films
German documentary films
Swiss documentary films
2000s German films